Black & White is the debut studio album by Canadian-South Korean singer G.NA. It features the title track of the same name, "Black & White". The album was released on January 18, 2011.

Background
In the album, G.NA collaborated with famous producer Kim Dohoon, as well as singers like Wheesung, Rain, and BEAST's Junhyung.

On January 4, 2011, Cube Entertainment revealed that G.NA will be returning with a full official album. She released the song "Nice to Meet You" featuring Wheesung on 11 January 2011 and it was finalized that she would release her full album on 18 January 2011 with the title track named "Black and White".

On January 13, 2011, a teaser for "Black & White" was released on her official YouTube channel. The full music video for "Black & White" was then released on January 17, 2011, the album was then released in record stores one day after the music video for "Black & White" was released on YouTube. The music video features 2AM member Jinwoon.

On March 8, 2011, a music video for "I Miss You Already" was released on G.NA's official YouTube channel.

Track listing

Chart performance

Promotion and awards
On January 21, 2011, G.NA started her promotion for Black & White on Music Bank.

On 17th and 24 February 2011, G.NA won on the on M! Countdown. On February 25, 2011, she also won her first ever Music Bank for her title song "Black & White". Music portal Dosirak has revealed that G.NA was the #1 best seller in digital sales for February. According to information released by Dosirak on February 27, the album took first in digital sales. Also, G.NA won her first Inkigayo Mutizen on February 27, 2011, marking her grand slam, for winning on all three music programs.

References

External links
 

Cube Entertainment albums
G.NA albums
2011 debut albums
Korean-language albums